Grochowska Street is a major road located in the Praga Południe district of Warsaw, Poland. Since November 1, 1925, a tram route has run along Grochowska Street. Currently trams and many bus lines connect Praga with Śródmieście, Wola, Rembertów and Wawer.

History 
On January 4, 1901, along the entire length of Grochowska Street, the WKD Jabłonowska was launched - a steam narrow-gauge railway with a track gauge of 800 mm, connecting Jabłonna with Wawer. Two stations were opened at Grochowska - Rogatki Moskiewskie and Grochów . In July 1915, the Russian troops blew up the Rogatki Moskiewskie station.

In 1925, after a tram line was launched along the street, steps were taken to liquidate the railway. On September 7, 1939, the cable car lines were suspended due to hostilities and then reactivated a month later. The Warsaw Uprising prevented the line from running. The WKD Jabłonowska railway was reborn as a state-owned enterprise in 1945. The last time the railway was used at Grochowska Street was on January 31, 1956.

References 

Streets in Warsaw